5th FAI World Rally Flying Championship took place between May 29 – June 1, 1986, in Castellón de la Plana in Spain.

There were 57 crews from 18 countries: Spain (5), West Germany (5), South Africa (5), Italy (5), Sweden (4), United Kingdom (4), Argentina (4), Poland (3), Luxembourg (3), France (3), the Netherlands (3), Chile (3), Denmark (3), Austria (2), Switzerland (2), Morocco (1), Venezuela (1), Ireland (1).

Results

Individual

Team
Counted two best crews (number of penal points):
 - 574
 - 1208
 - 2047
 - 5414

External links
Strona FAI - 5th FAI World Rally Flying Championship

Rally Flying 05
Fédération Aéronautique Internationale
1986 in Spain
Aviation history of Spain
May 1986 events in Europe
June 1986 events in Europe